Sardón de Duero is a municipality in the province of Valladolid, Castile and León, Spain. According to the 2004 census (INE), the municipality has a population of 668 inhabitants. There is a factory producing mantecadas in Sardón de Duero, as well as the Monastery of Santa María de Retuerta.

Municipalities in the Province of Valladolid